The 1995 Boston Red Sox season was the 95th season in the franchise's Major League Baseball history. The Red Sox finished first in the American League East with a record of 86 wins and 58 losses, as teams played 144 games (instead of the normal 162) due to the 1994–95 Major League Baseball strike. The Red Sox then lost to the American League Central champion Cleveland Indians in the ALDS.

Offseason 
 November 7, 1994: Bill Haselman was signed as a free agent by the Red Sox.
 November 7, 1994: Juan Bell was signed as a free agent by the Red Sox.
 December 5, 1994: Selected Vaughn Eshelman from the Baltimore Orioles in the Rule 5 Draft.
 December 7, 1994: Jeff McNeely and Nate Minchey were traded to the St. Louis Cardinals for Luis Alicea.
 December 9, 1994: Otis Nixon and Luis Ortiz were traded by the Red Sox to the Texas Rangers for José Canseco.

Regular season 

The Red Sox collected an MLB-high of 286 doubles in 1995, for an average of nearly 2 per game.

Season standings

Record vs. opponents

Notable transactions 
 April 8, 1995: Mike MacFarlane was signed as a free agent by the Red Sox.
 April 9, 1995: Stan Belinda was signed as a free agent by the Red Sox.
 April 9, 1995: Cory Bailey and Scott Cooper were traded by the Red Sox to the St. Louis Cardinals for Mark Whiten and Rhéal Cormier.
 April 9, 1995: Reggie Jefferson was signed as a free agent by the Red Sox.
 April 11, 1995: Erik Hanson was signed as a free agent by the Red Sox.
 April 14, 1995: Troy O'Leary was selected off waivers from the Milwaukee Brewers.
 April 18, 1995: Zane Smith was signed as a free agent by the Red Sox.
 April 22, 1995: Derek Lilliquist was signed as a free agent by the Red Sox.
 April 26, 1995: Tim Wakefield was signed as a free agent by the Red Sox.
 May 26, 1995: Tuffy Rhodes was selected off waivers by the Red Sox from the Chicago Cubs.
 May 30, 1995: Mike Maddux was signed as a free agent by the Red Sox.
 June 1, 1995: Pat Burrell was drafted by the Red Sox in the 43rd round of the 1995 Major League Baseball draft, but did not sign.
 June 6, 1995: Willie McGee was signed as a free agent by the Red Sox.
 July 6, 1996: Frankie Rodriguez and a player to be named later were traded to the Minnesota Twins for Rick Aguilera. J. J. Johnson was sent to the Twins on October 11 to complete the trade.
 July 24, 1995: Mark Whiten was traded by the Red Sox to the Philadelphia Phillies for Dave Hollins.
 July 26, 1995: Wally Whitehurst was released by the Red Sox.
 July 31, 1995: The Red Sox traded players to be named later to the Atlanta Braves for Mike Stanton and a player to be named later. The trade was completed on August 31, when the Braves sent Matt Murray to the Red Sox, and the Red Sox sent Mike Jacobs (minors) and Marc Lewis (minors) to the Braves.
 August 10, 1995: Eric Gunderson was selected off waivers from the Seattle Mariners.
 August 14, 1995: Wes Chamberlain was traded to the Kansas City Royals for Chris James.
 August 31, 1995: Dwayne Hosey was selected off waivers from the Kansas City Royals.

Opening Day Line Up

Roster

Player stats

Batting

Starters by position
Note: G = Games played; AB = At bats; H = Hits; Avg. = Batting average; HR = Home runs; RBI = Runs batted in; SB = Stolen bases

Other batters 
Note: G = Games played; AB = At bats; H = Hits; Avg. = Batting average; HR = Home runs; RBI = Runs batted in; SB = Stolen bases

Pitching

All starting and relief pitchers
Note: G = Games pitched; GS = Games started; IP = Innings pitched; W = Wins; L = Losses; SV = Saves; ERA = Earned run average; SO = Strikeouts

ALDS

Farm system 

The Trenton Thunder replaced the New Britain Red Sox as the Red Sox' Double-A affiliate. The Class A Michigan Battle Cats replaced the Class A-Advanced Lynchburg Red Sox.

Source:

Game log 

|- style="text-align:center; background-color:#bfb;"
| 1 || April 26 || Twins  || 9–0 || Sele (1–0) || Erickson (0–1) || — || Fenway Park || 32,980 || 1–0 || W1
|- style="text-align:center; background-color:#bfb;"
| 2 || April 28 || White Sox  || 10–4 || Cormier (1–0) || Bere (0–1) || — || Fenway Park || 23,199  || 2–0 || W2
|- style="text-align:center; background-color:#bfb;"
| 3 || April 29 || White Sox  || 8–0 || Hanson (1–0)  || Álvarez (0–1) || — || Fenway Park || 27,631 || 3–0 || W3
|- style="text-align:center; background-color:#fbb;"
| 4 || April 30 || White Sox  || 11–17 || DeLeon (1–0)  || Rodriguez (0–1)  || — || Fenway Park || 30,658 || 3–1 || L1
|-

|- style="text-align:center; background-color:#fbb"
| 5 || May 1 || @ Yankees || 3–5 || Howe (1–0) || Lilliquist (0–1) || Wetteland (3) || Yankee Stadium || 17,412 || 3–2 || L2
|- style="text-align:center; background-color:#bfb"
| 6 || May 2 || @ Yankees || 8–0 || Eshelman (1–0) || Hitchcock (0–1) || — || Yankee Stadium || 13,694 || 4–2 || W1 
|- style="text-align:center; background-color:#fbb;"
| 7 || May 3 || @ Yankees || 3–4 (13)|| Wickman (1–0) || Pierce (0–1) || — || Yankee Stadium || 19,990 || 4–3 || L1
|- style="text-align:center; background-color:#fbb;"
| 8 || May 4 || @ Yankees || 3–5 || Ausanio (1–0) || Johnston (0–1) || Wetteland (4) || Yankee Stadium || 18,994 || 4–4 || L2
|- style="text-align:center; background-color:#bfb;"
| 9 || May 5 || @ Tigers || 10–7 || Lilliquist (1–1) || Lira (0–1) || Ryan (1) || Tiger Stadium || 10,041 || 5–4 || W1 
|- style="text-align:center; background-color:#bfb;"
| 10 || May 6 || @ Tigers || 5–3 || Sele (2–0) || Bergman (0–3) || Belinda (1) || Tiger Stadium || 16,564 || 6–4 || W2 
|- style="text-align:center; background-color:#bfb;"
| 11 || May 7 || @ Tigers || 12–1 || Eshelman (2–0) || Groom (0–1) || — || Tiger Stadium || 10,752 || 7–4 || W3 
|- style="text-align:center; background-color:#bfb;"
| 12 || May 9 || Orioles || 4–3 || Belinda (1–0) || Benítez (0–2) || — || Fenway Park || 22,006 || 8–4 || W4 
|- style="text-align:center; background-color:#bfb;"
| 13 || May 10 || Orioles || 6–2 || Hanson (2–0) || Fernandez (0–1) || — || Fenway Park || 19,776 || 9–4 || W5
|- style="text-align:center; background-color:#bbb"
| — || May 11 || Orioles  || colspan=8|Postponed (rain). Makeup date August 10.
|- style="text-align:center; background-color:#fbb;"
| 14 || May 12 || Yankees || 2–12 || Hitchcock (1–2) || Sele (2–1) || — || Fenway Park || 32,754 || 9–5 || L1 
|- style="text-align:center; background-color:#bfb;"
| 15 || May 13 || Yankees || 6–4 || Eshelman (3–0) || Wickman (1–1) || Ryan (2) || Fenway Park || 32,695 || 10–5 || W1 
|- style="text-align:center; background-color:#bfb;"
| 16 || May 14 || Yankees || 3–2 || Peña (1–0) || Howe (1–1) || — || Fenway Park || 32,526 || 11–5 || W2 
|- style="text-align:center; background-color:#bfb"
| 17 || May 16 || @ Brewers || 5–0 || Hanson (3–0) || Scanlan (1–1) || — || Milwaukee County Stadium || 7,714 || 12–5 || W3 
|- style="text-align:center; background-color:#bfb"
| 18 || May 17 || @ Brewers || 8–2 || Sele (3–1) || Bones (2–1) || — || Milwaukee County Stadium || 10,934 || 13–5 || W4
|- style="text-align:center; background-color:#bfb"
| 19 || May 18 || Indians || 4–3 || Belinda (2–0) || Poole (1–2) || — || Fenway Park || 24,285 || 14–5 || W5 
|- style="text-align:center; background-color:#fbb"
| 20 || May 19 || Indians || 5–9 || Julián Tavárez (1–0) || Ryan (0–1) || — || Fenway Park || 23,507 || 14–6 || L1 
|- style="text-align:center; background-color:#fbb"
| 21 || May 20 || Indians || 5–7 || Plunk (2–0) || Peña (1–1) || Mesa (4) || Fenway Park || 29,412 || 14–7 || L2
|- style="text-align:center; background-color:#fbb"
| 22 || May 21 || Indians || 10–12 || Assenmacher (1–0) || Pierce (0–2) || Mesa (5) || Fenway Park || 32,339 || 14–8 || L3
|- style="text-align:center; background-color:#bfb"
| 23 || May 23 || @ Mariners || 5–4 (10)|| Belinda (3–0) || Frey (0–2) || Ryan (3) || Kingdome || 11,858 || 15–8 || W1 
|- style="text-align:center; background-color:#fbb;"
| 24 || May 24 || @ Mariners || 6–15 || Carmona (1–1) || Pierce (0–3) || Nelson (1) || Kingdome || 10,041 || 15–9 || L1 
|- style="text-align:center; background-color:#fbb;"
| 25 || May 25 || @ Mariners || 3–4 || Belcher (2–0) || Smith (0–1) || Ayala (6) || Kingdome || 12,194 || 15–10 || L2 
|- style="text-align:center; background-color:#bfb;"
| 26 || May 26 || @ Angels || 8–3 || Hanson (4–0) || Williams (1–2) || — || Anaheim Stadium || 27,816 || 16–10 || W1 
|- style="text-align:center; background-color:#bfb"
| 27 || May 27 || @ Angels || 12–1 || Wakefield (1–0) || Bielecki (2–1) || — || Anaheim Stadium || 29,792 || 17–10 || W2 
|- style="text-align:center; background-color:#fbb"
| 28 || May 28 || @ Angels || 3–8 || Finley (2–4) || Van Egmond (0–1) || — || Anaheim Stadium || 27,497 || 17–11 || L1 
|- style="text-align:center; background-color:#bfb"
| 29 || May 29 || @ Athletics || 9–6 || Smith (1–1) || Stewart (2–4) || — || Oakland-Alameda County Coliseum || 30,846 || 18–11 || W1 
|- style="text-align:center; background-color:#bfb"
| 30 || May 30 || @ Athletics || 1–0 || Wakefield (2–0) || Darling (1–2) || Ryan (4) || Oakland-Alameda County Coliseum || 11,224 || 19–11 || W2 
|- style="text-align:center; background-color:#bfb"
| 31 || May 31 || @ Athletics || 6–5 || Hanson (5–0) || Stottlemyre (3–1) || Ryan (5) || Oakland-Alameda County Coliseum || 14,616 || 20–11 || W3 
|-

|- style="text-align:center; background-color:#bfb;"
| 32 || June 2 || Mariners || 6–5 (10)|| Belinda (4–0) || Torres (0–2) || — || Fenway Park || 33,476 || 21–11 || W4 
|- style="text-align:center; background-color:#bfb;"
| 33 || June 3 || Mariners || 10–8 || Cormier (2–0) || Carmona (1–2) || Ryan (6) || Kingdome || 27,301 || 22–11 || W5
|- style="text-align:center; background-color:#bfb;"
| 34 || June 4 || Mariners || 2–1 (10)|| Wakefield (3–0) || Ayala (1–1) || — || Fenway Park || 28,512 || 23–11 || W6
|- style="text-align:center; background-color:#bfb"
| 35 || June 5 || Angels || 3–2 || Hanson (6–0) || Bielecki (2–2) || Ryan (7) || Fenway Park || 22,027 || 24–11 || W7
|- style="text-align:center; background-color:#fbb"
| 36 || June 6 || Angels || 3–12 || Langston (4–1) || Looney (0–1) || James (1) || Fenway Park || 23,977 || 24–12 || L1 
|- style="text-align:center; background-color:#bfb"
| 37 || June 7 || Angels || 5–1 || Clemens (1–0) || Finley (3–5) || — || Fenway Park || 23,372 || 25–12 || W1 
|- style="text-align:center; background-color:#fbb"
| 38 || June 8 || Angels || 8–10 || Butcher (5–0) || Cormier (2–1) || Smith (15) || Fenway Park || 25,336 || 25–13 || L1
|- style="text-align:center; background-color:#bfb"
| 39 || June 9 || Athletics || 4–1 || Wakefield (4–0) || Stewart (3–5) || — || Fenway Park || 30,304 || 26–13 || W1 
|- style="text-align:center; background-color:#fbb"
| 40 || June 10 || Athletics || 5–8 || Corsi (2–0) || Maddux (1–1) || — || Fenway Park || 31,418 || 26–14 || L1
|- style="text-align:center; background-color:#fbb;"
| 41 || June 11 || Athletics || 1–8 || Stottlemyre (5–1) || Smith (1–2) || — || Fenway Park || 29,737 || 26–15 || L2
|- style="text-align:center; background-color:#fbb;"
| 42 || June 12 || @ Blue Jays || 3–4 (12)|| Timlin (3–0) || Ryan (0–2) || — || SkyDome || 40,171 || 26–16 || L3
|- style="text-align:center; background-color:#bfb;"
| 43 || June 13 || @ Blue Jays || 11–7 || Maddux (2–1) || Hentgen (4–4) || — || SkyDome || 36,297 || 27–16 || W1
|- style="text-align:center; background-color:#fbb;"
| 44 || June 14 || @ Blue Jays || 3–5 || Leiter (5–2) || Wakefield (4–1) || Castillo (1) || SkyDome || 37,898 || 27–17 || L1 
|- style="text-align:center; background-color:#fbb;"
| 45 || June 16 || Brewers || 3–4 || Miranda (4–2) || Hanson (6–1) || Fetters (5) || Fenway Park || 29,086 || 27–18 || L2
|- style="text-align:center; background-color:#fbb;"
| 46 || June 17 || Brewers || 1–9 || Sparks (2–2) || Clemens  (1–1) || — || Fenway Park || 29,882 || 27–19 || L3
|- style="text-align:center; background-color:#bfb;"
| 47 || June 18 || Brewers || 4–2 || Smith (2–2) || Bones (4–4) || Belinda (2) || Fenway Park || 28,646 || 28–19 || W1
|- style="text-align:center; background-color:#fbb;"
| 48 || June 19 || @ Indians || 3–4 (10)|| Plunk (4–1) || Ryan (0–3) || — || Jacobs Field || 41,645 || 28–20 || L1 
|- style="text-align:center; background-color:#fbb;"
| 49 || June 20 || @ Indians || 2–9 || Ogea (3–0) || Eshelman (3–1) || — || Jacobs Field || 40,190 || 28–21 || L2
|- style="text-align:center; background-color:#bfb;"
| 50 || June 21 || @ Indians || 3–1 || Hanson (7–1) || Hershiser (5–3) || Belinda (3) || Jacobs Field || 41,948 || 29–21 || W1
|- style="text-align:center; background-color:#bfb"
| 51 || June 22 || @ Orioles || 4–1 || Clemens (2–1) || Brown (5–6) || Belinda (4) || Camden Yards || 45,081 || 30–21 || W2
|- style="text-align:center; background-color:#fbb"
| 52 || June 23 || @ Orioles || 5–7 || Mussina (6–5) || Smith (2–3) || Lee (1) || Camden Yards || 46,306 || 30–22 || L1 
|- style="text-align:center; background-color:#bfb"
| 53 || June 24 || @ Orioles || 6–5 || Cormier (3–1) || Orosco (1–1) || Belinda (5) || Camden Yards || 47,262 || 31–22 || W1
|- style="text-align:center; background-color:#fbb"
| 54 || June 25 || @ Orioles || 1–10 || Rhodes (2–2) || Eshelman (3–2) || — || Camden Yards || 47,561 || 31–23 || L1
|- style="text-align:center; background-color:#bfb"
| 55 || June 26 || Blue Jays || 4–3 || Belinda (5–0) || Castillo (0–2) || — || Fenway Park || 26,716 || 32–23 || W1
|- style="text-align:center; background-color:#bfb"
| 56 || June 27 || Blue Jays || 6–5 (11)|| Lilliquist (2–1) || Williams (0–2) || — || Fenway Park || 30,262 || 33–23 || W2
|- style="text-align:center; background-color:#fbb;"
| 57 || June 28 || Blue Jays || 4–8 || Cone (6–4) || Smith (2–4) || — || Fenway Park || 31,467 || 33–24 || L1
|- style="text-align:center; background-color:#bfb;"
| 58 || June 29 || Tigers || 7–1 || Wakefield (5–1) || Moore (5–6) || — || Fenway Park || 28,457 || 34–24 || W1
|- style="text-align:center; background-color:#fbb;"
| 59 || June 30 || Tigers || 6–7 || Boever (4–3) || Ryan (0–4) || Henneman (14) || Fenway Park || 31,349 || 34–25 || L1
|-

|- style="text-align:center; background-color:#fbb;"
| 60 || July 1 || Tigers || 2–11 || Lira (5–4) || Hanson (7–2) || Doherty (1) || Fenway Park || 33,359 || 34–26 || L2
|- style="text-align:center; background-color:#bfb"
| 61 || July 2 || Tigers || 12–11 || Belinda (6–0) || Boever (4–4) || — || Fenway Park || 34,344 || 35–26 || W1
|- style="text-align:center; background-color:#bfb"
| 62 || July 3 || @ Royals  || 12–5 || Smith (3–4) || Appier (11–4) || Maddux (1) || Kauffman Stadium || 24,742 || 36–26 || W2
|- style="text-align:center; background-color:#bfb"
| 63 || July 4 || @ Royals  || 6–5 || Wakefield (6–1) || Gubicza (5–7) || Belinda (6) || Kauffman Stadium || 26,584 || 37–26 || W3
|- style="text-align:center; background-color:#fbb;"
| 64 || July 5 || @ Royals || 2–3 || Pichardo (5–3) || Rodriguez (0–2) || — || Kauffman Stadium || 7,511 || 37–27 || L1
|- style="text-align:center; background-color:#fbb;"
| 65 || July 6 || @ Twins || 4–6 || Radke (5–7) || Smith (3–5) || Stevens (1) || Metrodome || 11,934 || 37–28 || L2
|- style="text-align:center; background-color:#bfb;"
| 66 || July 7 || @ Twins || 5–4 || Belinda (7–0) || Guardado (0–7) || Aguilera (13) || Metrodome || 12,594 || 38–28 || W1
|- style="text-align:center; background-color:#fbb"
| 67 || July 8 || @ Twins || 5–9 || Guthrie (4–3) || Belinda (7–1) || — || Metrodome || 14,838 || 38–29 || L1
|- style="text-align:center; background-color:#bfb"
| 68 || July 9 || @ Twins || 7–0 || Wakefield (7–1) || Rodriguez (0–3) || — || Metrodome || 18,574 || 39–29 || W1 
|- style="text-align:center; background-color:#fbb"
| 69 || July 13 || Rangers || 8–9 || Vosberg (4–2) || Clemens (2–2) || Russell (13) || Fenway Park || 33,315 || 39–30 || L1
|- style="text-align:center; background-color:#bfb"
| 70 || July 14 || Rangers || 5–2 || Wakefield (8–1) || Pavlik (5–5) || Aguilera (14) || Fenway Park || 32,348 || 40–30 || W1
|- style="text-align:center; background-color:#fbb"
| 71 || July 15 || Rangers || 2–7 || Gross (4–8) || Hanson (7–3) || — || Fenway Park || 34,004 || 40–31 || L1
|- style="text-align:center; background-color:#fbb"
| 72 || July 16 || Rangers || 2–5 || Rogers (9–4) || Smith (3–6) || Russell (14) || Fenway Park || 30,295 || 40–32 || L2
|- style="text-align:center; background-color:#fbb"
| 73 || July 17 || Royals || 3–4 || Gubicza (7–7) || Suppan (0–1) || Montgomery (16) || Fenway Park || 24,891 || 40–33 || L3
|- style="text-align:center; background-color:#bfb;"
| 74 || July 18 || Royals || 4–1 || Clemens (3–2) || Gordon (6–6) || Aguilera (15) || Fenway Park || 26,960 || 41–33 || W1
|- style="text-align:center; background-color:#bfb;"
| 75 || July 19 || @ White Sox || 5–3 || Wakefield (9–1) || Sirotka (0–1) || Aguilera (16) || Comiskey Park || 22,391 || 42–33 || W2
|- style="text-align:center; background-color:#bfb;"
| 76 || July 20 || @ White Sox || 3–1 || Hanson (8–3) || McCaskill (4–3) || Aguilera (17) || Comiskey Park || 21,235 || 43–33 || W3
|- style="text-align:center; background-color:#bfb;"
| 77 || July 21 || Twins || 13–5 || Smith (4–6) || Trombley (1–5) || Hudson (1) || Fenway Park || 31,124 || 44–33 || W4
|- style="text-align:center; background-color:#fbb;"
| 78 || July 22 || Twins || 7–8 || Guthrie (5–3) || Suppan (0–2) || Stevens (2) || Fenway Park || 34,384 || 44–34 || L1
|- style="text-align:center; background-color:#fbb"
| 79 || July 23 || Twins || 3–8 || Tapani (5–11) || Clemens (3–3) || — || Fenway Park || 34,205 || 44–35 || L2
|- style="text-align:center; background-color:#bfb"
| 80 || July 24 || Twins || 4–1 || Wakefield (10–1) || Radke (7–8) || Aguilera (18) || Fenway Park || 26,333 || 45–35 || W1
|- style="text-align:center; background-color:#fbb"
| 81 || July 25 || White Sox || 3–8 || Bere (5–8) || Cormier (3–2) || Hernández (14) || Fenway Park || 33,069 || 45–36 || L1
|- style="text-align:center; background-color:#bfb"
| 82 || July 26 || White Sox || 5–3 || Smith (5–6) || Fernandez (4–7) || Aguilera (19) || Fenway Park || 33,457 || 46–36 || W1
|- style="text-align:center; background-color:#fbb"
| 83 || July 27 || White Sox || 4–5 || Karchner (1–0) || Aguilera (1–2) || Hernández (15) || Fenway Park || 34,474 || 46–37 || L1
|- style="text-align:center; background-color:#bfb"
| 84 || July 28 || @ Rangers || 6–2 || Maddux (3–1) || Taylor (0–1) || — || The Ballpark in Arlington || 39,199 || 47–37 || W1
|- style="text-align:center; background-color:#bfb"
| 85 || July 29 || @ Rangers || 7–1 || Wakefield (11–1) || Gross (4–10) || — || The Ballpark in Arlington || 46,717 || 48–37 || W2
|- style="text-align:center; background-color:#fbb"
| 86 || July 30 || @ Rangers || 6–7 || Whiteside (3–3) || Hanson (8–4) || Russell (16) || The Ballpark in Arlington || 37,219 || 48–38 || L1
|-

|- style="text-align:center; background-color:#bfb"
| 87 || August 1 || @ Tigers || 13–3 || Smith (6–6) || Moore (5–11) || — || Tiger Stadium || 20,170 || 49–38 || W1
|- style="text-align:center; background-color:#fbb"
| 88 || August 2 || @ Tigers || 0–5 || Bergman (4–6) || Clemens (3–4) || — || Tiger Stadium || 16,488 || 49–39 || L1
|- style="text-align:center; background-color:#bfb"
| 89 || August 3 || @ Tigers || 10–2 || Wakefield (12–1) || Nitkowski (1–4) || — || Tiger Stadium || 11,451 || 50–39 || W1
|- style="text-align:center; background-color:#bfb"
| 90 || August 4 || @ Blue Jays || 7–1 || Hanson (9–4) || Rogers (0–1) || — || SkyDome || 40,137 || 51–39 || W2
|- style="text-align:center; background-color:#bfb;"
| 91 || August 5 || @ Blue Jays || 9–3 || Cormier (4–2) || Hentgen (8–9) || — || SkyDome || 41,454 || 52–39 || W3
|- style="text-align:center; background-color:#bfb;"
| 92 || August 6 || @ Blue Jays || 6–4 || Eshelman (4–2) || Hurtado (3–1) || Aguilera (20) || SkyDome || 38,194 || 53–39 || W4
|- style="text-align:center; background-color:#bfb;"
| 93 || August 7 || @ Blue Jays || 5–4 (10)|| Belinda (8–1) || Crabtree (0–2) || — || SkyDome || 42,135 || 54–39 || W5
|- style="text-align:center; background-color:#bfb;"
| 94 || August 8 || Indians || 5–1 || Wakefield (13–1) || Clark (6–4) || — || Fenway Park || 34,574 || 55–39 || W6
|- style="text-align:center; background-color:#bfb;"
| 95 || August 9 || Indians || 9–5 || Hanson (10–4) || Plunk (5–2) || — || Fenway Park || 34,240 || 56–39 || W7
|- style="text-align:center; background-color:#bfb;"
| 96 || August 10 || Orioles || 11–1 || Cormier (5–2) || Erickson (7–9) || — || Fenway Park || — || 57–39 || W8
|- style="text-align:center; background-color:#bfb;"
| 97 || August 11 || Orioles || 5–4 (12)|| Aguilera (2–2) || Clark (2–3) || — || Fenway Park || 33,143 || 58–39 || W9
|- style="text-align:center; background-color:#bfb;"
| 98 || August 12 || Orioles || 7–0 || Clemens (4–4) || Mussina (13–7) || — || Fenway Park || 34,234 || 59–39 || W10
|- style="text-align:center; background-color:#bfb;"
| 99 || August 13 || Orioles || 3–2 || Wakefield (14–1) || Krivda (0–2) || Belinda (7) || Fenway Park || 34,158 || 60–39 || W11
|- style="text-align:center; background-color:#bfb"
| 100 || August 14 || Yankees || 9–3 || Hanson (11–4) || Kamieniecki (3–4) || — || Fenway Park ||34,319 || 61–39 || W12
|- style="text-align:center; background-color:#fbb"
| 101 || August 15 || Yankees || 2–9 || Hitchcock (6–7) || Cormier (5–3) || — || Fenway Park || 34,616 || 61–40 || L1
|- style="text-align:center; background-color:#bfb"
| 102 || August 16 || Yankees || 7–4 || Gunderson (2–1) || Wickman (2–4) || Belinda (8) || Fenway Park || 34,304 || 62–40 || W1
|- style="text-align:center; background-color:#bfb"
| 103 || August 17 || @ Angels || 4–3 || Gunderson (3–1) || Habyan (3–4) || Belinda (9) || Anaheim Stadium || 25,435 || 63–40 || W2
|- style="text-align:center; background-color:#fbb"
| 104 || August 18 || @ Mariners || 3–9 || Wolcott (1–0) || Wakefield (14–2) || — || Kingdome || 27,256 || 63–41 || L1
|- style="text-align:center; background-color:#bfb"
| 105 || August 19 || @ Mariners || 4–3 || Hanson (12–4) || Benes (6–8) || Aguilera (21) || Kingdome || 36,007 || 64–41 || W1
|- style="text-align:center; background-color:#bfb"
| 106 || August 20 || @ Mariners || 7–6 || Cormier (6–3) || Bosio (8–6) || Aguilera (22) || Kingdome || 21,813 || 65–41 || W2
|- style="text-align:center; background-color:#bfb;"
| 107 || August 21 || @ Angels || 6–4 || Eshelman (5–2) || Anderson (6–5) || Belinda (10) || Anaheim Stadium || 23,943 || 66–41 || W3
|- style="text-align:center; background-color:#bfb;"
| 108 || August 22 || @ Angels || 6–4 || Clemens (5–4) || Harkey (7–8) || Aguilera (23) || Anaheim Stadium || 27,822 || 67–41 || W4
|- style="text-align:center; background-color:#bfb;"
| 109 || August 23 || @ Angels || 6–5 (10)|| Stanton (2–1) || Smith (0–5) || Aguilera (24) || Anaheim Stadium || 29,053 || 68–41 || W5
|- style="text-align:center; background-color:#bfb"
| 110 || August 24 || @ Athletics || 13–6 || Hanson (13–4) || Ontiveros (8–5) || — || Oakland-Alameda County Coliseum || 13,922 || 69–41 || W6
|- style="text-align:center; background-color:#fbb"
| 111 || August 25 || @ Athletics || 1–6 || Johns (2–0) || Cormier (6–4) || — || Oakland-Alameda County Coliseum || 17,156 || 69–42 || L1
|- style="text-align:center; background-color:#fbb;"
| 112 || August 26 || @ Athletics || 4–11 || Stottlemyre (12–5) || Smith (6–7) || — || Oakland-Alameda County Coliseum || 23,177 || 69–43 || L2
|- style="text-align:center; background-color:#bfb;"
| 113 || August 27 || @ Athletics || 4–1 || Clemens (6–4) || Van Poppel (3–5) || Aguilera (25) || Oakland-Alameda County Coliseum || 24,220 || 70–43 || W1
|- style="text-align:center; background-color:#fbb;"
| 114 || August 29 || Mariners || 4–6 || Benes (7–8) || Wakefield (14–3) || Charlton (3) || Fenway Park || 31,328 || 70–44 || L1
|- style="text-align:center; background-color:#bfb;"
| 115 || August 30 || Mariners || 7–6 || Maddux (4–1) || Nelson (5–2) || Aguilera (26) || Fenway Park || 32,356 || 71–44 || W1
|- style="text-align:center; background-color:#fbb;"
| 116 || August 31 || Mariners || 2–11 || Wolcott (2–1) || Cormier (6–5) || Guetterman (1) || Fenway Park || 30,627 || 71–45 || L1
|-

|- style="text-align:center; background-color:#bfb;"
| 117 || September 1 || Angels || 11–3 || Clemens (7–4) || Boskie (6–3) || — || Fenway Park || 32,861 || 72–45 || W1
|- style="text-align:center; background-color:#bfb;"
| 118 || September 2 || Angels || 5–4 || Smith (7–7) || Langston (13–4) || Aguilera (27) || Fenway Park || 32,867 || 73–45 || W2
|- style="text-align:center; background-color:#bfb;"
| 119 || September 3 || Angels || 8–1 || Wakefield (15–3) || Finley (13–10) || — || Fenway Park || 32,987 || 74–45 || W3
|- style="text-align:center; background-color:#bfb;"
| 120 || September 5 || Athletics || 7–4 (14)|| Aguilera (3–2) || Reyes (3–5) || — || Fenway Park || 27,080 || 75–45 || W4
|- style="text-align:center; background-color:#bfb;"
| 121 || September 6 || Athletics || 8–2 || Clemens (8–4) || Johns (3–1) || — || Fenway Park || 30,454 || 76–45 || W5
|- style="text-align:center; background-color:#fbb"
| 122 || September 8 || @ Yankees || 4–8 || Cone (15–7) || Wakefield (15–4) || Howe (2) || Yankee Stadium || 35,896 || 76–46 || L1
|- style="text-align:center; background-color:#fbb"
| 123 || September 9 || @ Yankees || 1–9 || Pettitte (9–8) || Smith (7–8) || — || Yankee Stadium || 47,719 || 76–47 || L2
|- style="text-align:center; background-color:#fbb"
| 124 || September 10 || @ Yankees || 3–9 || Hitchcock (8–9) || Hanson (13–5) || — || Yankee Stadium || 27,527 || 76–48 || L3
|- style="text-align:center; background-color:#fbb"
| 125 || September 11 || @ Orioles || 10–7 || Lee (2–0) || Gunderson (3–2) || Jones (22) || Camden Yards || 40,585 || 76–49 || L4
|- style="text-align:center; background-color:#fbb"
| 126 || September 12 || @ Orioles || 5–6 || Hartley (1–0) || Hudson (0–1) || Orosco (2) || Camden Yards || 40,282 || 76–50 || L5
|- style="text-align:center; background-color:#bfb"
| 127 || September 13 || @ Orioles || 2–0 || Wakefield (16–4) || Haynes (0–1) || Aguilera (28) || Camden Yards || 41,536 || 77–50 || W1
|- style="text-align:center; background-color:#fbb"
| 128 || September 14 || @ Indians || 3–5 || Hershiser (14–6) || Eshelman (5–3) || Mesa (43) || Jacobs Field || 41,812 || 77–51 || L1
|- style="text-align:center; background-color:#bfb"
| 129 || September 15 || @ Indians || 6–3 || Hanson (14–5) || Embree (2–2) || — || Jacobs Field || 41,833 || 78–51 || W1
|- style="text-align:center; background-color:#fbb"
| 130 || September 16 || @ Indians  || 5–6 || Clark (9–6) || Clemens (8–5) || Mesa (44) || Jacobs Field || 41,765 || 78–52 || L1
|- style="text-align:center; background-color:#bfb;"
| 131 || September 17 || @ Indians  || 9–6 || Suppan (1–2) || Shuey (0–2) || Aguilera (29) || Jacobs Field || 41,723 || 79–52 || W1
|- style="text-align:center; background-color:#fbb;"
| 132 || September 18 || Brewers || 1–6 || Bones (10–10) || Wakefield (16–5) || — || Fenway Park || 28,176 || 79–53 || L1 
|- style="text-align:center; background-color:#bfb;"
| 133 || September 19 || Brewers || 5–3 || Eshelman (6–3) || Sparks (8–10) || Aguilera (30) || Fenway Park || 27,060 || 80–53 || W1 
|- style="text-align:center; background-color:#090;"
| 134 || September 20 || Brewers  || 3–2 || Cormier (7–5) || Karl (5–6)  || Aguilera (31) || Fenway Park || 32,563 || 81–53 || W2
|- style="text-align:center; background-color:#bbb"
| — || September 22 || Blue Jays  || colspan=8|Postponed (rain). Makeup date September 23.
|- style="text-align:center; background-color:#bfb;"
| 135 || September 23 (1)|| Blue Jays  || 5–0 || Clemens (9–5) || Leiter (11–10) || — || Fenway Park || 32,791 || 82–53 || W3
|- style="text-align:center; background-color:#fbb;"
| 136 || September 23 (2)|| Blue Jays  || 6–8 || Ware (2–1) || Wakefield (16–6) || Castillo (13) || Fenway Park || 21,266 || 82–54 || L1
|- style="text-align:center; background-color:#fbb"
| 137 || September 24 || Blue Jays || 1–2 || Guzmán (4–14) || Aguilera (3–3) || Timlin (5) || Fenway Park || 32,427 || 82–55 || L2
|- style="text-align:center; background-color:#fbb"
| 138 || September 25 || Tigers || 4–7 || Gohr (1–0) || Murray (0–3) || Doherty (6) || Fenway Park || 25,662 || 82–56 || L3
|- style="text-align:center; background-color:#bfb"
| 139 || September 26 || Tigers || 5–1 || Smith (8–8) || Nitkowski (2–7) || — || Fenway Park || 24,032 || 83–56 || W1
|- style="text-align:center; background-color:#fbb"
| 140 || September 27 || Tigers || 5–7 || Lima (3–9) || Wakefield (16–7) || Blomdahl (1) || Fenway Park || 30,989 || 83–57 || L1
|- style="text-align:center; background-color:#bfb"
| 141 || September 28 || @ Brewers || 11–6 || Clemens (10–5) || Scanlan (4–7) || — || Milwaukee County Stadium || 8,286 || 84–57 || W1
|- style="text-align:center; background-color:#bfb"
| 142 || September 29 || @ Brewers || 11–9 || Hanson (15–5) || Bones (10–12) || Aguilera (32) || Milwaukee County Stadium || 10,775 || 85–57 || W2
|- style="text-align:center; background-color:#bfb"
| 143 || September 30 || @ Brewers || 9–1 || Maddux (5–1) || Sparks (9–11) || — || Milwaukee County Stadium || 14,610 || 86–57 || W3
|- style="text-align:center; background-color:#fbb"
| 144 || October 1 || @ Brewers || 1–8 || Karl (6–7) || Wakefield (16–8) || — || Milwaukee County Stadium || 15,453 || 86–58 || L1
|-

|Reference:

Postseason game log 

|- style="text-align:center; background:#fbb;"
| 1  || October 3 || @ Indians || 4–5 (14)|| Hill (1–0) || Smith (0–1)  || — || Jacobs Field || 44,218 || 0–1 || L1
|- style="text-align:center; background:#fbb;"
| 2  || October 4 || @ Indians || 0–4 || Hershiser (1–0) || Hanson (0–1) || — || Jacobs Field || 44,262 || 0–2 || L2
|- style="text-align:center; background:#fbb;"
| 3  || October 6 || Indians || 2–8 || Nagy (1–0) || Wakefield (0–1) || — || Fenway Park || 34,211 || 0–3 || L3
|- style="text-align:center; style="background-color:#009900;"
|colspan="11" | Red Sox Lose Series 0–3
|-

Awards and honors 
 Erik Hanson – AL Pitcher of the Month (August)
 John Valentin – Silver Slugger Award (SS)
 Mo Vaughn – Silver Slugger Award (1B), American League MVP
 Tim Wakefield – AL Pitcher of the Month (July)

All-Star Game
 Erik Hanson, reserve P
 Mo Vaughn, reserve 1B

References

External links
 1995 Boston Red Sox at Baseball Reference
 1995 Boston Red Sox season at Baseball Almanac
 1995 Boston Red Sox Post-Season Media Guide

Boston Red Sox seasons
American League East champion seasons
Boston Red Sox
Boston Red Sox
Red Sox